London Buses route 133 is a Transport for London contracted bus route in London, England. Running between Streatham and Liverpool Street stations, it is operated by Arriva London.

History

Route 133 commenced operating on 27 March 1929 from South Croydon to Liverpool Street station. On 24 July 1971, the route was withdrawn between Croydon and Streatham with one man operation introduced with Daimler Fleetlines. 

Upon being put out to tender, it was taken over by London General's Stockwell Garage on 6 January 1990 with Northern Counties bodied Volvo Citybuses. Upon being re-tendered, route 133 was taken over by Arriva London's Norwood garage on 22 January 2010. When next tendered, it was retained by Arriva London, with it transferred to Brixton garage on 21 January 2017.

On 23 November 2022, it was announced that route 133 would be rerouted to run to Holborn instead of Liverpool Street, following a consultation that proposed that it would run to St Bartholomew's Hospital. This change will be implemented by the end of 2023.

Current route
Route 133 operates via these primary locations

Streatham station  
St Leonard's Church
Streatham Hill station 
Brixton station  
Oval station 
Kennington station 
Elephant & Castle station  
Inner London Crown Court
Borough station 
London Bridge station  
Monument station 
Bank station  
Liverpool Street bus station

References

External links

Bus routes in London
Transport in the London Borough of Lambeth
Transport in the London Borough of Southwark
Transport in the City of London